The Kelch Gothic Revival silver service, created in 1900, was one of the finest silver services made by Peter Carl Fabergé. The silverware was commissioned by Alexander and Barbara Kelch (Russian:Кельх, Kelkh). Peter Carl Fabergé considered it the most important silver masterpiece made in his workshop; it was also the most expensive.

Kelch’s silverware is assumed to have been melted down circa 1918, following the October Revolution. For the next 100 years experts of Fabergé had claimed that the tableware was completely destroyed. In 2017, it appeared that items from the service had survived, having been discovered in Poland.

History 
The idea for designing the service in the neo-Gothic style was conceived in 1898 along with the rebuilding of the Kelch mansion in Saint Petersburg. The service was intended to complement Barbara Kelch’s Gothic scheme for the new dining room.

The tableware was designed in 1900 by the distinguished Russian architect Fedor Shekhtel who cooperated with Fabergé. The tableware was made in 1900 in a Moscow branch of Fabergé's company. Alexander Kelch paid the astounding sum of 125,000 rubles for the tableware. The price Alexander Kelch paid for the tableware makes it the most expensive Fabergé work that was ever made.

Parts of the Kelch’s tableware were presented on the charity exhibition of Fabergé works organized in 1902 in Saint Petersburg in Baron Paul von Dervies' mansion. This was the one and only exhibition of Fabergé works organized in the period of his activity. The exhibition presented Fabergé works belonging to Empresses Maria Feodorovna and Alexandra Feodorovna and family members of the House of Romanov and representatives of the aristocracy. The Kelch’s silver service was the only work shown at this exhibition which didn't belong to the aristocrats, but to the family of rich industrialists.

Until 1905 Kelch’s silver tableware was in the Kelch mansion in Saint Petersburg. In that year, as a result of Alexander and Barbara separation, the tableware was transported to the Bazanov’s palace in Moscow. After the October Revolution in 1918 the Kelch’s silver service was confiscated and melted down. For 100 years, until 2017 it was considered as completely destroyed, as no parts of the service were in any Fabergé collection. In January 2017 some pieces of cutlery appearing to come from the neo-Gothic Kelch service surfaced in the art market in Poland.

Description 
The Aleksander and Barbara Kelch's representative tableware was made in the neo-Gothic style. The style of silver service referred to the style and the décor of the dining room in Kelch mansion in Saint Petersburg. The decoration and ornaments used by Fabergé are coming from the English and German Gothic style.

Motifs of the tableware are stylized Gothic architecture, plant ornaments, dragons, griffins, lizards, snakes and other Gothic creatures, heraldic lilly, crown-topped shield with a monogram in the form of the letter 'K'.

The tableware consisted of many dishes and objects, including: a surtout de table, two seven-lamp candlesticks, two high tureens, soup tureens with lids, platters, bowls, plates, sauce boats, trays, cabarets, cutlery, salt cellars and others.

The medieval dragons were the main motif decorating the tableware, therefore the Kelch’s tableware sometimes is being called the "Fabergé dragon tableware". Crown-topped shield with a monogram in the form of the letter 'K' is also an important motif decorating the objects belonging to the Kelch’s tableware. The pieces were marked with the Fabergé hallmark and the court jeweler hallmark.

References

Works cited

External links 
 Fabergé silver service commissioned by Alexander & Barbara Kelch Fabergé silver service commissioned by Alexander & Barbara Kelch. Article on website dr Adam Szymanski. Illustrations.
 Movie: Fabergé priceless Art Treasure found in Poland

Fabergé
1900 works
Silver objects